Judge Fogel may refer to:

Herbert Allan Fogel (1929–2002), judge of the United States District Court for the Eastern District of Pennsylvania
Jeremy Fogel (born 1949), judge of the United States District Court for the Northern District of California